John Anderson (July 19, 1934 – January 22, 2009) was a Danish-Canadian former ice hockey executive who was the interim General Manager of the Buffalo Sabres from December 4, 1978, to June 11, 1979, taking his team to the 1979 playoffs.

References

External links
 John Anderson statistics at EliteProspects.com

1934 births
2009 deaths
Buffalo Sabres executives
Danish ice hockey people